The eukaryotic small ribosomal subunit (40S) is the smaller subunit of the eukaryotic 80S ribosomes, with the other major component being the large ribosomal subunit (60S). The "40S" and "60S" names originate from the convention that ribosomal particles are denoted according to their sedimentation coefficients in Svedberg units. It is structurally and functionally related to the 30S subunit of 70S prokaryotic ribosomes. However, the 40S subunit is much larger than the prokaryotic 30S subunit and contains many additional protein segments, as well as rRNA expansion segments.

Function
The 40S subunit contains the decoding center which monitors the complementarity of tRNA and mRNA in protein translation. It is the largest component of several translation initiation complexes, including the 43S and 48S preinitiation complexes (PICs), being bound by several eukaryotic initiation factors, including eIF1, eIF1A, and eIF3. The 40S ribosomal subunit is also tightly bound by the HCV IRES to form a binary complex mediate by protein-mRNA and rRNA-mRNA interactions. More information can be found in the articles on the ribosome, the eukaryotic ribosome (80S), and the article on protein translation.

Overall structure
The shape of the small subunit can be subdivided into two large segments, the head and the body. Characteristic features of the body include the left and right feet, the shoulder and the platform. The head features a pointed protrusion reminiscent of a bird's beak. The mRNA binds in the cleft between the head and the body, and there are three binding sites for tRNA, the A-site, P-site and E-site (see article on protein translation for details).
The core of the 40S subunit is formed by the 18S ribosomal RNA (abbreviated 18S rRNA), which is homologous to the prokaryotic 16S rRNA. This rRNA core is decorated with dozens of proteins. In the figure "Crystal Structure of the Eukaryotic 40S Ribosomal Subunit from T. thermophila", the ribosomal RNA core is represented as a grey tube and expansion segments are shown in red. Proteins which have homologs in eukaryotes, archaea and bacteria are shown as blue ribbons. Proteins shared only between eukaryotes and archaea are shown as orange ribbons and proteins specific to eukaryotes are shown as red ribbons.

40S ribosomal proteins
The table "40S ribosomal proteins" shows the individual protein folds of the 40S subunit colored by conservation. Proteins which have homologs in eukaryotes, archaea and bacteria (EAB) are shown as blue ribbons. Proteins shared only between eukaryotes and archaea (EA) are shown as orange ribbons and proteins specific to eukaryotes (E) are shown as red ribbons. Eukaryote-specific extensions of conserved proteins, ranging from a few residues or loops to very long alpha helices and additional domains, are highlighted in red. For a details, refer to the article on the eukaryotic ribosome. Historically, different nomenclatures have been used for ribosomal proteins. For instance, proteins have been numbered according to their migration properties in gel electrophoresis experiments. Therefore, different names may refer to homologous proteins from different organism, while identical names not necessarily denote homologous proteins. The table "40S ribosomal proteins" crossreferences the human ribosomal protein names with yeast, bacterial and archaeal homologs. Further information can be found in the ribosomal protein gene database (RPG).

See also
 Eukaryotic large ribosomal subunit (60S)

References

External links 
 Ribosomal Protein Gene Database (RPG)

Ribosomal RNA